Farkaždin is a village in Serbia. It is located in the Zrenjanin municipality, in the Central Banat District, Vojvodina province. The village has a Serb ethnic majority (94.94%) and its population numbering 1,386 people (2002 census).

Name
Names in other languages: , .

Historical population

1961: 1,778
1971: 1,743
1981: 1,662
1991: 1,586

References
Slobodan Ćurčić, Broj stanovnika Vojvodine, Novi Sad, 1996.

See also
List of places in Serbia
List of cities, towns and villages in Vojvodina
Undiscovered locations in Serbia / Neotkrivene lokacije u Srbiji

Populated places in Serbian Banat
Zrenjanin